Sarajlija is the Bosnian demonym for Sarajevans. It is also found as a nickname or surname. It may refer to:

List of Sarajevans
Sima Milutinović Sarajlija, Serbian writer
Mirza Sarajlija, Slovenian basketball player
Jovan Jančić–Sarajlija, leader of Jančić's Revolt

Serbo-Croatian words and phrases